Paul Wischeidt (born 7 February 1944) is a German fencer. He competed in the individual and team sabre events at the 1968 and 1972 Summer Olympics.

References

External links
 

1944 births
Living people
German male fencers
Olympic fencers of West Germany
Fencers at the 1968 Summer Olympics
Fencers at the 1972 Summer Olympics
People from Dormagen
Sportspeople from Düsseldorf (region)